Montrose Christian School was a private Christian school in North Bethesda, Maryland, with a Rockville postal address. It was formerly operated by the Montrose Baptist Church, Maryland's second largest Southern Baptist church. It educated around 370 students before its closure in 2013. Its first Senior High School class graduated in 1986.

Early history
The history of Montrose Christian School is intimately connected with its parent organization, Montrose Baptist Church. While Montrose Baptist Church had established a nursery school in 1968 and a daycare in 1971, it recognized an opportunity to further its evangelical mission through the development of a full-time day school. On April 30, 1977, Montrose Christian School was officially incorporated in Rockville, Maryland. Starting with an inaugural kindergarten class of five children, it quickly expanded the next year to include Grades 1-4. During each subsequent year, another grade or two was added until eventually in May 1986, it graduated its first class of High School students.

Athletics
The school had been recognized for its athletic accomplishments, particularly for those of its basketball team, which had been successful at recruiting players across the United States and around the world to play in Rockville. Kevin Durant's transfer to the school led USA Today to name Montrose its preseason pick for the top spot on its Super 25 rankings of the top high school basketball teams in 2005-06.

The school had appeared regularly on USA Today'''s Super 25 national rankings, finishing the season ranked 25th in 2000-01, 9th in 2002-03, 19th in 2003-04, 19th in 2005-06 and 22nd in 2006-07.

Controversies

The school was embroiled in a lawsuit, in February 1997, involving three employees, represented by the ACLU, who said they were fired for not belonging to the school's parent church. While a judge initially ruled in the favor of the dismissed employees, the decision was later overturned on appeal in 2001 based on the argument that "'for a religious corporation, association, or society to hire and employ employees of a particular religion,' is severable and valid." ''

Reverend Ray Hope, a.k.a. Dr. Otis Ray Hope, senior pastor at the Montrose Baptist Church, resigned in October 2002 after questioning by the church's governing council about his involvement with the Maryland International Students Association, an organization that recruited foreign students attending Montrose Christian School. Officials for the school's parent church alleged that the recruiting organization had failed to reimburse the school for the cost of the students' education; that Rev. Ray Hope owed the church's school more than $580,000.

In February 2012 a female teacher at Montrose Christian School was arrested and charged with sexually abusing a student for a period of over one year.

Due to fiscal mismanagement, the school had suffered from financial difficulties in its later years and had 16 liens placed against its properties.

Notable alumni
Justin Anderson (born 1993), professional basketball player
Miguel "Ali" Berdiel (born 1983), is a Puerto Rican professional basketball player
Jarrell Brantley (born 1996), basketball player
Jason Conley (born 1981), the first freshman ever to lead NCAA Division I in scoring
Kevin Durant (born 1988), professional basketball player for the Phoenix Suns
Tyrone Johnson (born 1992), professional basketball player.
Linas Kleiza (born 1985), professional basketball player
K.J. Matsui (born 1985), played guard on the Columbia University basketball team, and was the first Japanese born NCAA Division I player
Patrick McCaw (born 1995), professional basketball player for the Delaware Blue Coats
Terrence Ross (born 1991), professional basketball player for the Orlando Magic
Greivis Vasquez (born 1987), professional basketball player, and Venezuela national team

References

External links
Official site

Private K-12 schools in Montgomery County, Maryland
Baptist schools in the United States
Baptist Christianity in Maryland
North Bethesda, Maryland
Christian schools in Maryland
Educational institutions established in 1977
Educational institutions disestablished in 2013
1977 establishments in Maryland
2013 disestablishments in Maryland
Religion in Rockville, Maryland